Clarity: Music of Clare Fischer is the 13th album by jazz singer Roseanna Vitro, released in 2014 by Random Act Records.  The first instance of a singer releasing an album devoted to Fischer's music, Clarity unveils six new lyrics to previously instrumental compositions. One of these, "Take Your Breath and Sing" (aka "O Canto"), features the composer's son Brent Fischer on vibraphone.

Reception
All About Jazz awarded the album 5 stars, with reviewer Michael C. Bailey citing Vitro's vocal prowess, arranging skills, and astute selection of material. JazzTimes''' Christopher Loudon makes note of Vitro's "standout quintet" while acknowledging both the historic nature of the project ("never before has a solo vocalist paid Fischer album-length tribute") and its "magnificently thoughtful" execution.

The significance of this recording was not lost on Buffalo News'' music critic Jeff Simon:
This disc is as groundbreaking and as hugely valuable as her Newman adaptations were regrettable. This is what Grammys, it seems to me, ought to be for. What you have here sung by Vitro is music by Clare Fischer, a great jazz composer whose complex and difficult melodies and gorgeous songs are perfect for Vitro’s abundant gifts as a jazz singer [...] What she hopes to do, she says, is introduce Fischer to the repertoire of many more jazz singers. With what she does here – along with pianist Mark Soskins [sic] and violinist Sara Caswell – she may wind up doing just that. An important disc, whether she succeeds or not.

Track listing
All music composed by Clare Fischer except track #2.  All other writing credits are for lyrics alone.  Where no credits are given, both words and music are Fischer's.
 "Morning" - 6:38
 "Web of Love" ("Inquietacao") (Ary Barroso, Roger Schore) - 5:31
 "Seagull" ("Gaviota") (Weaver Copeland) - 5:35
 "Love's Path" ("Love's Walk") (Paul Wickliffe) - 5:19
 "Swingin' with the Duke" (Cheryl Pyle) - 4:59
 "Pensativa" - 6:26
 "Life's Journey" ("Pavillion") (Cheryl Pyle) - 5:43                                          
 "Sleep My Child" ("Sleep Sweet Child") (Roger Schore) - 4:45
 "Take Your Breath and Sing" ("O Canto") (Paul Wickliffe) - 5:55
 "I Remember Spring" (Ron Boustead)  - 6:00

Personnel
Vocals, arrangements – Roseanna Vitro
Piano, arrangements – Mark Soskin
Violin – Sara Caswell
Bass – Dean Johnson
Drums – Tim Horner
Percussion – Mino Cinelu
VIbraphone – Brent Fischer (track #9)

Notes

References

2014 albums
Roseanna Vitro albums
Tribute albums